Karnai ('Barim') is an Austronesian language spoken by about 915 individuals in small villages near Wasu, Morobe Province, on Umboi Island, and near Saidor in Madang Province, Papua New Guinea.

External links 
 Materials on Karnai are included in the open access Arthur Capell collections (AC1 and AC2) held by Paradisec.

References

Korap languages
Languages of Madang Province
Languages of Morobe Province